Morven, known officially as Morven Museum & Garden, is a historic 18th-century house at 55 Stockton Street in Princeton, Mercer County, New Jersey, United States. It served as the governor's mansion for nearly four decades in the twentieth century, and has been designated a National Historic Landmark for its association with Richard Stockton (1730-1781), a signer of the United States Declaration of Independence.

History
In 1701, Richard Stockton was granted  by William Penn which included the land where Morven now stands. His grandson Richard Stockton had  on which, in the 1750s, he built the house that his wife Annis Boudinot Stockton named "Morven", after a mythical Gaelic kingdom in Ireland.

Commodore Robert Stockton (1795–1866) later lived in the house that was built on the property. Robert Wood Johnson II, chairman of the company Johnson & Johnson, leased the home after Bayard Stockton died during 1932.

The house remained in Stockton family ownership until 1944, with it was purchased by New Jersey Governor Walter E. Edge. The sale was subject to the condition that Morven would be given to the state of New Jersey within two years of Edge's death. Edge transferred ownership of Morven to the state during 1954, several years before he died.

Morven served as New Jersey's first governor's mansion from 1944 until 1981, when it was donated to the New Jersey Historical Society. In 1982, Drumthwacket was designated as New Jersey Governor's Mansion and converted to the new official residence. Morven underwent research and restoration, and was opened as a museum in 2004.

Owners
"The Builder" Richard Stockton (c.1665-1709) from 1701 to 1709
Honorable John Stockton (1701-1758) from 1709 to 1758
"The Signer" Richard Stockton (1730–1781) from 1758 to 1781
"The Duke" Richard Stockton (1764-1828) from 1781 to 1828
Commodore Robert Field Stockton (1795–1866) from 1828 to 1866
Major Samuel Witham Stockton (1834-1899)
Walter E. Edge from 1944 to 1954
Governor's Mansion from 1954 to 1981
Museum since 1982

Architecture
Morven is a 2-1/2 story brick building, with a gabled roof and end chimneys.  Two-story wings extend to either side of the main block.  A Greek Revival porch extends across the center three bays of the main block's five-bay facade.  The interior has an atypical central hall plan.  The staircase, normally in the center hall in these plans, is instead placed crosswise in a rear hall which also provides access to the wings.  To the right of the central hall is the Gold Room, a parlor, while the main dining room is on the left.  The left wing housed servant quarters and the kitchen, while the right wing housed the library and a family room.  The interior styling is consistent with late 18th and early 19th century architectural fashions.

See also
National Register of Historic Places listings in Mercer County, New Jersey

References

External links

Official Website

See also
Westland Mansion, patterned after Morven
National Register of Historic Places listings in Mercer County, New Jersey

Houses completed in 1730
National Historic Landmarks in New Jersey
Historic house museums in New Jersey
Museums in Princeton, New Jersey
Biographical museums in New Jersey
Houses in Princeton, New Jersey
National Register of Historic Places in Mercer County, New Jersey
New Jersey Register of Historic Places
Historic district contributing properties in Mercer County, New Jersey
Stockton family of New Jersey
New Jersey
Governor of New Jersey